Emanuel Davidson (19 August 1902 – 3 November 1955) was a Dutch diver. He competed in the men's 10 metre platform event at the 1928 Summer Olympics.

References

External links
 

1902 births
1955 deaths
Dutch male divers
Olympic divers of the Netherlands
Divers at the 1928 Summer Olympics
Divers from Amsterdam